Triumph the Insult Comic Dog is a puppet character created, puppeteered and voiced by Robert Smigel. As his name indicates, Triumph's comedic style is almost exclusively insult comedy. A Montenegrin Mountain Hound, Triumph often puffs a cigar, which usually falls out of his mouth when he starts talking. He first appeared in 1997 on NBC's Late Night with Conan O'Brien, and also appeared on The Tonight Show with Conan O'Brien from time to time, as well as the short-lived TV Funhouse, TBS's Conan, Adult Swim's The Jack and Triumph Show, and The Late Show with Stephen Colbert. Smigel and Triumph have been ejected from several events for Triumph's antics, including the Westminster Kennel Club Dog Show, the Honolulu line for auditions for American Idol, and the 2004 Democratic National Convention (while shooting an aborted movie project).

Creation and debut 
Triumph was created by Robert Smigel in 1997 for a segment on Late Night with Conan O'Brien parodying the Westminster Kennel Club Dog Show, where Triumph appeared in a dog talent contest where his talent was telling bad jokes. Triumph speaks with a nebulous Eastern European accent, which Smigel based on his grandparents who were immigrants from Russia.

Notable appearances

Westminster Kennel Club Dog Show 

In 1999 and 2000, Triumph crashed the Westminster Kennel Club Dog Show in New York, and was ejected by security guards.

Star Wars 

In May 2002, Triumph paid a visit to Star Wars fans lining up for the premiere of Star Wars: Episode II – Attack of the Clones outside the Ziegfeld Theater in New York, mocking their actions and stereotypical nerd culture. Notable moments include a wedding that took place at the line, and the appearances of Blackwolf the Dragonmaster, a real-life fantasy gaming fan and the "Unofficial Wizard of New York", and Spock who gave everyone the finger. Smigel has said "It's still the Triumph sketch I hear the most about and I'd say it's still the best. The simplest explanation is that it features the funniest straight men Triumph's ever encountered. So you're laughing not only at the jokes but the faces, the costumes and committment [sic]. There's so much to enjoy."

Space Ghost Coast to Coast 

In 2004, Triumph appeared as the guest star on the hit Adult Swim series Space Ghost Coast to Coast in the episode "Dreams". Triumph offhandedly mentions having anal sex with Lassie, which causes friction between Space Ghost and Moltar over such topics being brought up on television.

MTV Video Music Awards and incident with Eminem 

In 2001 and 2002, Triumph appeared in the audience at the MTV Video Music Awards. In 2001, Triumph interviewed Carson Daly before spotting Jennifer Lopez and asking if he could sniff her butt.

In 2002, Triumph interviewed Moby before spotting Eminem, who covered Triumph with his hand, saying "I already got my TV time". Triumph was then shoved away by Eminem's bodyguards. The following day, Triumph appeared on Late Night with Conan O'Brien, and gave a press conference about the incident while wearing a neck brace. Triumph later appeared in Eminem's music video for "Ass Like That", and at the 2004 MTV Video Music Awards, Eminem began his performance by voicing a lookalike puppet.

2004 presidential campaign 

Triumph filmed a number of segments during the 2004 US presidential election cycle. In November 2003, in the early days of the 2004 U.S. presidential primary campaign, Triumph was the "lead guest" on The Tonight Show with Jay Leno the same night that Democratic candidate John Kerry also appeared on the show. Kerry made a dramatic entry, riding his Harley-Davidson motorcycle onto the stage; but Triumph, in characteristic style, poked fun at him with a series of scathingly rude remarks, to Kerry's evident discomfort. (Among his jibes: "The poop I made in the dressing room had more heat than John Kerry!")

In July and August 2004, Triumph followed up with visits to both major parties' national conventions. During the Democratic National Convention in Boston (from which he was ejected), Triumph and Michael Moore attempted to crash Bill O'Reilly's set. O'Reilly, having his makeup applied at the time, shouted, "If I have to come out there, Insult Dog, you're gonna be talking a lot higher than you are now." He also gained entry to the Republican convention in New York, and even debated actor Ron Silver during the wrap-up on MSNBC.

2008 presidential election 

In September 2008, Triumph traveled to St. Paul, Minnesota to attend that year's Republican National Convention, where he filed a series of reports as he joked around with delegates inside the hall and protesters in the streets outside the convention. He also conducted a -minute interview (at a hotel across the street) with independent candidate Ralph Nader.

In October 2008, Triumph made an appearance at Hofstra University in Hempstead, New York during the final presidential debate between John McCain and Barack Obama. He interviewed and made jokes with political party supporters and with other members of the press, including the host of Fox News Channel's On the Record with Greta Van Susteren, making a surprise appearance on her show with Mr. Met, the mascot of the New York Mets.

The Jack and Triumph Show 

Triumph was a main character in the short-lived Adult Swim series The Jack and Triumph Show with Jack McBrayer and June Squibb. It premiered on February 20, 2015, and lasted until April 3, 2015.

2016 and 2020 presidential elections 

In February 2016, Triumph starred in Triumph's Election Special 2016, sponsored by Hulu and Funny or Die, traveling on the election trail. The program was nominated for an Emmy Award for Outstanding Writing for a Variety Special. In November 2016, after the election of Donald Trump as president, Triumph appeared on The Late Show with Stephen Colbert to discuss Trump's victory. In November 2018, Triumph covered the Texas Senate campaign between Ted Cruz and Beto O'Rourke for The Late Show. In February 2020, Triumph appeared on The Late Show to attempt to interview congresspeople during the first Trump impeachment trial. After holding up a sign behind Senator Lindsey Graham during a CNN interview, he was escorted out of the building before finishing the segment outside.

2022 U.S. Capitol arrest 
In June 2022, Smigel and six staffers from The Late Show with Stephen Colbert were arrested by the United States Capitol Police for an alleged unlawful entry in the Longworth House Office Building while filming a segment with Triumph during the January 6 Attack hearings.

Trademark lawsuit 

In 1999, after Triumph accused Pets.com's sock puppet mascot of being a "rip-off" of Triumph on television shows, in print media, online, and in a letter, the company sent lawsuit threats and cease and desist letters to Smigel claiming "unfair competition, dilution and potentially tortious interference with contract in violation of federal and state laws" and the following year filed a lawsuit against Late Night and Smigel. The bankruptcy and closing of the company during the dot-com bust of 2000 ended the lawsuit. Triumph humped the Pets.com dog in a bathroom during a segment of Late Night as an act of revenge.

Discography 

Triumph's 2003 album, Come Poop with Me, was released by Warner Bros. Records, and featured adult comedy and songs, plus a bonus DVD of live performances by Triumph. The album was nominated for a Grammy Award for Best Comedy Album. Appearing with Triumph on the album and the DVD were singer-actor Jack Black, comic actor Adam Sandler, Saturday Night Live cast members Maya Rudolph and Horatio Sanz; Blackwolf the Dragonmaster from the Star Wars skit; and Conan O'Brien. Notable songs include "I Keed", "Underage Bichon", "Lick Myself" and "Cats are Cunts".

On August 10, 2004, NBC released a DVD, Late Night with Conan O'Brien: The Best of Triumph, the Insult Comic Dog featuring select Triumph appearances from Late Night.

See also 

 Ed the Sock
 The Waldo Moment

References

External links 

Anthropomorphic dogs
Comedy television characters
Fictional interviewers
Fictional television personalities
Late Night with Conan O'Brien
Male characters in television
Puppets
Television characters introduced in 1997
Ventriloquists' dummies
Warner Records artists